Bryan Alfonso Cortés Carvajal (born 19 August 1991), known as Bryan Cortés, is a Chilean footballer currently playing for Deportes Recoleta as a midfielder.

External links
 
 

1991 births
Living people
People from El Loa Province
Chilean footballers
Cobreloa footballers
Universidad de Chile footballers
Santiago Wanderers footballers
Deportes La Serena footballers
Unión San Felipe footballers
Deportes Melipilla footballers
Deportes Recoleta footballers
Chilean Primera División players
Primera B de Chile players
Association football midfielders